State Highway 37 (SH-37) is a state highway in Power County in southern Idaho, United States that spans  north-south from the Oneida–Power county line to Interstate 86 (I-86).

Route description
The SH-37 begins at the Oneida County line on the Rockland Highway, just southwest of Buck Peak. (From the southern terminus of SH-37 the Rockland Highway continues south to Holbrook and the western terminus of SH-38.) The route heads northwest briefly before turning north to pass through the unincorporated community of Roy.

History
By 1927 the SH-37 designation had been assigned to a route south east of Coeur d'Alene in the northern part of the state. (By 1927 the north-south route through Malad City was designated as SH-21, but by 1937 it had been changed to SH-36.)

Between 1927 and 1937, the SH-37 designation was assigned to the highway which had been, by 1927, designated as SH-33. This highway followed the current routing of SH-37 from a point southwest of American Falls (on what was then US-30N, but now I-86) south through Rockland and on through Roy, but then continued on to Holbrook, and then finally heading east to Malad City (on what is now SH-38). Also between 1927 and 1937, the SH-38 designation had been applied to a highway (which, by 1927, had been previously designated as SH-32) that began in Roy and headed east and then northeast to Arbon, north to Pauline (along what is now the Arbon Highway) and then (along what is now the Bannock Highway) north to Crystal, and on to terminate in at the former routing of US-91 in Portneuf. By 1956, the southern terminus of SH-38 had changed from SH-37 in Roy to SH-37 east of Holbrook (via Buist to Arbon) Eventually, the routing of SH-38 was changed to its current route, with the roads through Buist, Arbon, and Crystal to Portneuf being entirely removed from the state highway system; as well as the section that was previously part of SH-37 between Holbrook and the Power County-Oneida County line.

Major intersections

See also

 List of state highways in Idaho
 List of highways numbered 37

References

External links

 Idaho Transportation Department Route 37 Milepoint Log
 Idaho Transportation Department Reports on ID 37

037
Transportation in Oneida County, Idaho
Transportation in Power County, Idaho